Chad Everette Fonville (born March 5, 1971) is an American former professional baseball infielder. He played in Major League Baseball for the Montreal Expos, Los Angeles Dodgers, Chicago White Sox, and Boston Red Sox between 1995 and 1999.

Career
Fonville attended Louisburg College. In 1991, he played collegiate summer baseball in the Cape Cod Baseball League for the Yarmouth-Dennis Red Sox and was named a league all-star.

Drafted by the San Francisco Giants in the 11th round of the 1992 MLB amateur draft, Fonville made his Major League Baseball debut with the Montreal Expos on April 28, 1995, and appeared in his final game on July 9, 1999.

He is now a coach for White Oak High in his hometown of Jacksonville, North Carolina.

References

External links

1971 births
Living people
African-American baseball coaches
African-American baseball players
Albuquerque Dukes players
American expatriate baseball players in Canada
Baseball coaches from North Carolina
Baseball players from North Carolina
Boston Red Sox players
Chicago White Sox players
Clinton Giants players
Columbus Clippers players
Everett Giants players
Los Angeles Dodgers players
Louisburg Hurricanes baseball players
Major League Baseball center fielders
Major League Baseball left fielders
Major League Baseball second basemen
Major League Baseball shortstops
Montreal Expos players
Nashua Pride players
New Haven Ravens players
Pawtucket Red Sox players
San Jose Giants players
Yarmouth–Dennis Red Sox players
21st-century African-American sportspeople
20th-century African-American sportspeople